John Leonard Horn (September 7, 1928 – August 18, 2006) was a scholar, cognitive psychologist and a pioneer in developing theories of multiple intelligence.

The structure of mental abilities

For his PhD research at the University of Illinois, Horn identified other broad intellectual abilities to supplement fluid reasoning ability (gf) and crystallized ability (gc) postulated by his supervisor Raymond Cattell.  As with Cattell, Horn rejected the existence of an even higher level factor of general intelligence ‘g’ asserted by Spearman (1927). In Horn (1988) he reported a full list of such broad level abilities:

gc (crystallized)

gf  (fluid)

gv (visual)

ga (auditory)

qf (quantitative)

gs (processing speed)

TSR (Long-term storage and retrieval)

SAR (Short-term acquisition and retrieval)

The Cattell-Horn model was, more or less, replicated by Carroll’s (1993) massive analysis by of 450+ intelligence measures, which also yielded a higher order factor similar to Spearman’s ‘g’. McGrew (2005) reported that in 1999 the test publisher ‘Riverside Publishing met with Horn and Carroll privately in Chapel Hill, North Carolina, to seek a common, more meaningful  umbrella term that would recognise the strong structural similarities of their respective theoretical models, yet also recognize their differences.  This sequence of conversations resulted in a verbal agreement that the phrase “Cattell-Horn-Carroll theory of cognitive abilities” made significant practical sense, and appropriately recognized the historical order of scholarly contribution of the three primary contributors.’

The Cattell-Horn- Carroll (CHC) theory is the basis for many modern IQ tests. Horn's parallel analysis, a method for determining the number of factors to keep in an exploratory factor analysis, is also named after him.

References

J. B. Carroll (1993), Human cognitive abilities: A survey of factor-analytic studies, Cambridge University Press, New York, NY, USA.

Horn, J. L. (1988). Thinking about human abilities. In J. R. Nesselroade & R. B. Cattell (Eds.), Handbook of multivariate experimental psychology. New York: Academic Press, (pp. 645–685)

McGrew, K. S. (2005). The Cattell-Horn-Carroll Theory of Cognitive Abilities. In D. P. Flanagan & P. L. Harrison (Eds.). (2012). Contemporary intellectual assessment: Theories, tests, and issues. (pp. 151–179). New York: Guilford Press.

Spearman, C. (1927). The abilities of man. London: Macmillan

Biography
He started his career as a Lecturer of Educational Psychology at the University of California, Berkeley in 1967. He was Associate Professor of Psychology at the University of Denver from 1970 to 1986. Meanwhile, he was also Research Associate at the Institute of Psychiatry of the University of London in England in 1972 and Research Associate of Psychiatric Clinic at the University Hospital in Lund, Sweden 1982. He was then Professor of Psychology & Head of Adult Development and Aging University of Southern California from 1986 to 2006.

He received numerous awards, including: Research Career Development Award, National Institutes of Health (1968–1972); Annual Prize for Distinguished Publications in Multivariate Psychology (SMEP) (1972); Lifetime Achievement Award, SMEP (1992). Horn also served as president of the National Association for the Advancement of Colored People and the American Civil Liberties Union.

He died in 2006.

References

External links
bio

1928 births
2006 deaths
20th-century American psychologists
University of Denver faculty
University of Southern California faculty
Intelligence researchers
People from St. Joseph, Missouri
Quantitative psychologists